The 1978 United States Senate election in Arkansas took place on November 7, 1978. Incumbent U.S. Senator John L. McClellan had died the previous December, leaving the seat vacant. Interim appointee Kaneaster Hodges Jr. did not run to the full seat, and was succeeded by Governor of Arkansas David Pryor.

Pryor won a highly-competitive three-way primary against U.S. Representatives Jim Guy Tucker and Ray Thornton, then defeated Tucker in a run-off election. Having secured the Democratic nomination, which was often tantamount to election in the American South prior to the 1980s, Pryor easily defeated Republican nominee Thomas Kelly and independent candidate John Black.

Democratic primary

Candidates
 A.C. Grigson
David Pryor, Governor of Arkansas
Ray Thornton, U.S. Representative from Conway
Jim Guy Tucker, U.S. Representative from Little Rock

Results

Run-off results

General election

Results

See also
1978 United States Senate elections

References 

1978
Arkansas
United States Senate